The Shoe-Horn Sonata is a 1995 Australian play by John Misto about Australian nurses in World War II. The play has been much revived and has become a study text in Australian schools.

References

External links
Productions in Australia at Ausstage
Review of 2015 Production at Daily Review
Review of 2015 production at Sydney Morning Herald

Australian plays
1995 plays
Plays about World War II